The High Five Interchange is one of the first five-level stack interchanges built in Dallas, Texas. Located at the junction of the Lyndon B. Johnson Freeway (Interstate 635, I-635) and the Central Expressway (US Highway 75, US 75), it replaces an antiquated combination interchange constructed in the 1960s.

The $261 million project was started in 2002 and completed in December 2005. It was designed by the HNTB Corporation and built by Zachry Construction Corporation.

The interchange is considered by Popular Mechanics to be one of "The World's 18 Strangest Roadways" because of its height (as high as a 12-story building), its 43 permanent bridges, and other unusual design and construction features. 
In 2006, the American Public Works Association named the High Five Interchange as "Public Works Projects of the Year".

Description
The High Five Interchange, north of downtown in Dallas, Texas, is a massive five-level freeway interchange. It is the junction of two major highways carrying heavy rush-hour traffic, the Lyndon B. Johnson Freeway (Interstate 635) and the Central Expressway (US 75), and is the first five-level stack interchange to be built in the city.

It replaces the antiquated three-level modified cloverleaf interchange built in the 1960s, which caused a severe bottleneck by narrowing US 75 down to two lanes at the junction of the two highways. The looped ramps of the cloverleaf forced motorists to slow down drastically, backing up traffic. Left-hand exits contributed to the congestion. Further, its two frontage roads were not directly connected to each other, making local access difficult.

Alluding to the celebratory gesture, the "High Five" name refers to the five flyover ramps that tower over the landscape, handling the left-turn movements. The interchange is as high as a 12-story building, and includes 43 bridges spread across five levels (the "High Five"), 710 support tiers, and 60 miles of additional highway. As part of the project, I-635 was widened to include four dedicated high-occupancy vehicle lanes (HOV lanes) that are barrier-separated and reversible.   

The roads on the five levels are:
Level I:  US 75, a six-lane highway, three lanes going each way
Level II: The junction of the two six-lane frontage roads, each having three through lanes in each direction, left-turn lanes, and turnarounds, and easy access to US 75 and I-635
Level III: I-635, ten regular lanes, five going each way, and four HOV lanes (two going each way) separated by barriers
Levels IV and V: Direct connection ramps (two levels), eliminating the left exits of the modified cloverleaf

The interchange, with its decorative etchings on precast concrete elements, along with the visually appealing coloration specified by the Texas Department of Transportation (TxDOT), can be regarded as an enormous work of public art. The High Five also incorporates a hiking and bike trail, named the Cottonwood Trail, which runs under all levels of the interchange.  The section of the trail passing beneath the interchange was constructed as part of the High Five project by TxDOT.

History 

The High Five Interchange project was planned as a replacement for the existing antiquated interchange, which accommodated 500,000 vehicles daily and was located in one of the most intensely developed commercial zones in Dallas. It was a collaborative project between the TxDOT, affected motorists and property owners, and the primary contractor, Zachry Construction. An essential consideration was to complete the project with as little disruption to the traffic flow as possible.

Reasons for upgrading the interchange, in addition to the need to increase traffic flow and reduce congestion, were to improve air quality, safety, and local access.

Zachry Construction Corporation submitted the lowest bid and was awarded the $261 million contract by TxDOT, the largest ever by that agency. The construction contract for the High Five Interchange was unique in that it contained elements not found in other construction project contracts. For example, it specified the concrete maturity method to be used to ensure the concrete's strength (the first time TxDOT had ever done so), and contained an early-completion bonus, a sliding scale of up to $11 million if the company completed the contract within four years. Also built into the construction contract was a provision that Zachry be charged for "lane rentals" by TxDOT for time they closed down traffic lanes—fees based on hourly assessments and the time of day the lane was closed. The fees ranged from $50 to a high of $110,000 for rush hours. In order not to interfere with traffic flow during construction, the new interchange was designed largely as elevated flyover ramps and viaducts so they could be built high over the existing junction lanes; once traffic was transferred to the new structures the old lanes could simply be closed off and removed. Little of the original interchange remained when the project was finished.

To save time and money, innovative construction methods were employed: The original plans called for the segments of the long ramps and spans (used to direct-connect roads) to be made of steel, but because building with steel would interfere with heavy traffic flow during construction, cast-in-place segmental concrete was substituted in the plans. However, Zachry decided to use precast concrete segmental bridges, rather than casting the bridge elements in place, and used a unique machine, designed and constructed by Deal S.R.L. of Italy and costing about $1 million, to move the pieces into place.

During the construction, 2.2 million cubic yards of earthwork was used, 350,000 cubic yards of concrete was mixed on site, and 300,000 square feet of retaining walls were built. Additionally, 40,000 feet of drilled shafts and 75,000 linear feet of drainage pipe were completed. In addition to the construction of 43 permanent bridges, six temporary bridges were built, resulting in 2.3 million square feet of bridge deck.

The project was designed by the HNTB Corporation, who provided professional engineering consultation throughout the construction, which had begun in 2002 and was completed in December 2005, more than 13 months sooner than planned.

Recognition 
In 2006, the American Public Works Association named the High Five "Public Works Project of the Year" for its massive size, its innovative design, the complexity and rapidity of its construction, and the need it fulfilled for the community. TxDOT as the managing agency, Zachry Construction Corporation as the primary contractor, and HNTB Corporation as the primary consultant received the award in recognition of their cooperative alliance in completing the project.

The interchange is ranked by Popular Mechanics as one of "The World's 18 Strangest Roadways", which called it a "labyrinth of lanes" and a "five-level marvel of engineering" because of its height, the number of its bridges and other unusual design and construction features.

See also

References

External links 

 Google Maps Satellite View
 Texas Freeway, includes picture of the old interchange
 Alternate view of old interchange
 Another view of the old interchange
 Dallas High Five Construction Photos, Feb.-May 2004
 Dallas High Five Interchange Tour Dallas, TX, ScrewdUPClickV2

State highways in Texas
Highways in Dallas
Road interchanges in the United States
U.S. Route 75